Enrico Franzoi (born 8 August 1982 in Mestre) is an Italian professional cyclo-cross and road bicycle racer, who currently rides for Italian amateur team ASD Salese. Franzoi has won the Italian Cyclo-cross Championships on four occasions – in 2005, 2006, 2007 and 2009.

Major results

Cyclo-cross

1999–2000
 1st  National Junior Championships
2000–2001
 1st  National Under-23 Championships
2001–2002
 1st  National Under-23 Championships
 1st Bassano del Grappa
 1st Milan
2002–2003
 1st  UCI World Under-23 Championships
 1st  National Under-23 Championships
2003–2004
 1st  National Under-23 Championships
 1st Rovato-Lodetto
2004–2005
 1st  National Championships
 1st Clusone
 1st Mogliano Veneto
 1st Rovato
 1st San Martino Silvelle
2005–2006
 1st  National Championships
 1st Bassano del Grappa
 1st Mogliano Veneto
2006–2007
 1st  National Championships
 3rd  UCI World Championships
2007–2008
 1st Lebbeke
2008–2009
 1st  National Championships

Road

2006
 9th Overall Three Days of De Panne
2007
 8th Paris–Roubaix
2008
 1st Stage 1 (TTT) Vuelta a España
 5th Kuurne–Brussels–Kuurne
2010
 8th Overall Tour Alsace
 9th Druivenkoers Overijse
2012
 3rd Grand Prix Královéhradeckého kraje
 9th Overall Tour of Romania
2014
 1st Stage 1a (TTT) Giro del Friuli-Venezia Giulia

References

External links
 
 
 

1982 births
Living people
Sportspeople from Venice
Italian male cyclists
Cyclo-cross cyclists
Cyclists from the Metropolitan City of Venice
21st-century Italian people